Cwmystwyth mines are located in Cwmystwyth, Ceredigion, Wales and exploited a part of the Central Wales Orefield.

Mining heritage
Cwm Ystwyth  is considered the most important non-ferrous metal mining site in Wales providing a premier example of mining heritage in Ceredigion. Within the site there is evidence for all phases of mining activity; from the Bronze Age, through the medieval period, to its revival in the 18th century and the peak of activity with a subsequent decline in the late 19th and the early 20th century. It has been designated as a Scheduled Ancient Monument. The site also features prominently in the Upland Ceredigion Landscape of Historic Interest.

History
Silver, lead and zinc have been mined in the valley of the River Ystwyth since Roman times, an activity that reached its peak in the 18th century. The largest of the very many mines was Cwmystwyth Mine. It is reputed that the average age at death of the miners in Cwmystwyth was 32, largely because of acute lead poisoning. There is no longer any active metal mining in the Ystwyth valley.

Water use
Water was extensively used during the silver and lead mining process to extract the ore. In the case of Cwm Ystwyth mine, much of the water was brought in by contour hugging leats from several miles upstream. The channel of the leat can still be followed on the hillside and is clearly visible from the road on the opposite side of the valley. Much of the water was used for hushing, prospecting and working the ore in the open.

Banc Ty'nddôl sun-disc
In October 2002 the Banc Ty'nddôl sun-disc was discovered on the mining site.  The disc is over 4,000 years old, which makes it the earliest gold artifact discovered in Wales.

Environmental Impacts 
A survey of the River Ystwyth in 1919 showed that due to mining activity in the area, the fauna was restricted to 9 species, which consisted mostly of insects. The lead concentration in the river was found to be 0.4 mg/L. In 1922 another survey was conducted; the number of species had increased to 26, with the lead concentration decreasing to below 0.1 mg/L. The number of species increased to 63 by 1939, but there were still no fish present in the river. The lead concentration fell to below 0.05 mg/L. Fish had returned to most of the river by 1975. However, there were no fish within a 3 km stretch below the Cwm Ystwyth mine.

Gallery

Footnotes

References

Register of Landscapes of Outstanding Historic Interest in Wales, Cadw (Cardiff, 1998), pp. 12–16.
For a comprehensive account of the mine during the historic period, see Hughes, Simon J., The Cwmystwyth Mines, (2nd edn., Talybont, 1993);
Prehistoric period, see Timberlake, S. and Mighall, T., 'Historic and Prehistoric Mining on Copa Hill', Archaeology in Wales, 32 (1992), pp. 38–44.
Cambrian Mountains: Metal Mines Project, by Brian Clouston and Partners, and Parkman Consulting Engineers, (unpublished report to Dyfed County Council, December 1988)
  
 
 Timberlake, S. 2002 a Medieval lead smelting boles near Penguelan, Cwmystwyth, Archaeology in Wales 42: 45-59
 — 2002 b Cwmystwyth, Banc Ty'nddôl: gold disc, AW 42, 97-98 Timberlake, S. 2003 Excavations on Copa Hill, Cwmystwyth (1986–1999); An Early Bronze Age copper mine within the uplands of Central Wales. BAR British Series 348 Oxford: Archaeopress.
 Timberlake, S., A. Gwilt & M. Davis. In prep. The Banc Ty'nddôl Gold Disc. The Proceedings of the Prehistoric Society.
 

History of Ceredigion
Lead mines in Wales
Scheduled monuments in Wales
Archaeological sites in Ceredigion
Elenydd
Silver mines in the United Kingdom
Zinc mines in the United Kingdom